New River is an album by mandolinist David Grisman and jazz pianist Denny Zeitlin that was released in 2001. Half the songs were written by Grisman, half by Zeitlin, with one a collaboration.

Track listing 
 "Brazilian Street Dance" (Zeitlin) – 7:09
 "Dawg Funk "(Grisman) – 5:47
 "Moving Parts" (Zeitlin) – 4:53
 "Blue Midnite" (Grisman) – 4:57
 "New River" (Zeitlin) – 5:44
 "Waltz for Gigi" (Grisman) – 4:27
 "DG/DZ Blues" (Grisman, Zeitlin) – 8:47
 "On the March" (Zeitlin) – 10:31
 "Fourteen Miles to Barstow" (Grisman) – 7:25

Personnel 
 David Grisman – mandolin
 Denny Zeitlin – piano

References 

2001 albums
David Grisman albums
Acoustic Disc albums